The 1990 Syracuse Orangemen football team represented Syracuse University in the 1990 NCAA Division I-A football season.  This season marked the end of two eras for Syracuse football. First, it was Dick MacPherson's final year as head coach. He would leave to coach the 1991 New England Patriots. Second, it was the final season for Syracuse football as an independent. Starting with the 1991 season, the Big East Conference, of which Syracuse was a founding member, began sponsoring football competition.

Schedule

Roster

References

Syracuse
Syracuse Orange football seasons
Aloha Bowl champion seasons
Syracuse Orangemen football